This is a list of world bantamweight boxing champions, as recognized by the four major sanctioning organizations in boxing:

 The World Boxing Association (WBA), established in 1921 as the National Boxing Association (NBA). The WBA often recognize up to two world champions in a given weight class; Super champion and Regular champion.
 The World Boxing Council (WBC), established in 1963.
 The International Boxing Federation (IBF), established in 1983.
 The World Boxing Organization (WBO), established in 1988.
World titles have been historically recognized by the International Boxing Union (IBU) from 1913-1963 and the New York State Athletic Commission (NYSAC) from 1920 to 1977. Both the IBU and the NYSAC became members of the World Boxing Council.

World

IBF

WBC

WBA

WBO

See also
 List of British world boxing champions

External links

Bantamweight Champions

World boxing champions by weight class